The 1954 Pacific typhoon season has no official bounds; it ran year-round in 1954, but most tropical cyclones tend to form in the northwestern Pacific Ocean between June and December. These dates conventionally delimit the period of each year when most tropical cyclones form in the northwestern Pacific Ocean.

The scope of this article is limited to the Pacific Ocean, north of the equator and west of the international date line. Storms that form east of the date line and north of the equator are called hurricanes; see 1954 Pacific hurricane season. Tropical Storms formed in the entire west Pacific basin were assigned a name by the Fleet Weather Center on Guam.

Systems

Tropical Storm 01W 
 A storm that affected the Philippines.

Typhoon Elsie 
Elsie hit Hong Kong.

Typhoon Flossie 
Flossie tracked into open waters.

Typhoon Grace 

Typhoon Grace struck the Southern Japanese islands of Kyūshū and Shikoku as well as Okinawa. 28 people were killed and 33 were missing.

Typhoon Helen

Typhoon Ida 
Ida was the strongest storm of 1954, and made landfall in China.

Tropical Storm 07W

Typhoon Kathy 
Kathy hit Japan.

Typhoon June 

Typhoon June struck the Southern Japanese hitting the area west of Kanto especially hard. 107 people were killed and 39 were missing.

Typhoon Lorna 

Typhoon Lorna brushed the southern coast of the Japanese island of Shikoku. 34 people were killed and 20 were missing.

Typhoon Marie 

Typhoon Marie had a minimum pressure of 956 mb and a maximum windspeeds of 85 mph. Marie crossed the southern islands of Kyūshū and Shikoku before turning northeast and striking Hokkaidō island. Marie caused the ship Toya Maru to sink in the Tsugaru Strait. 1,361 people were killed and 400 were left missing. Due to this disaster, the typhoon is known in Japan as the Toya Maru Typhoon.

Typhoon Nancy

Typhoon Olga

Tropical Storm 15W

Typhoon Pamela 

On October 27, Typhoon Pamela formed as a tropical depression. Pamela reached a peak of 900 mbar and 175 mph on November 1 and reached a secondary peak of 935 mbars on November 5.
Pamela was one of three storms that reached Category 5 super typhoon status in the South China Sea, with others being Typhoon Rammasun of 2014 and Typhoon Rai of 2021.

Gusts at landfall just to the west of Macau reached 175 km/h in Waglan Island and 155 km/h in Hong Kong Observatory which were the strongest since November 10, 1900 when the mean hourly wind speed reached 113 km/h (71 mph or 61 kts) at the Royal Observatory in Tsim Sha Tsui, in par with Typhoon Gloria.

Typhoon Ruby 
Ruby hit the Philippines as a typhoon, and hit China as a tropical storm.

Typhoon Sally 
Sally brushed the Philippines as a Category 5 typhoon.

Typhoon Tilda 
Tilda hit the Philippines as a typhoon and dissipated near Vietnam.

Storm names

See also 

 1954 Pacific hurricane season
 1954 Atlantic hurricane season
 1950s North Indian Ocean cyclone seasons
 1950s Australian region cyclone seasons
 Australian region cyclone seasons: 1953–54 1954–55
 South Pacific cyclone seasons: 1953–54 1954–55
 South-West Indian Ocean cyclone seasons: 1953–54 1954–55

References